Latisana-Lignano-Bibione is a railway station serving the town of Latisana and the seaside resorts of Lignano and Bibione, in the region of Friuli-Venezia Giulia, northern Italy. The station is located on the Venice–Trieste railway. The train services are operated by Trenitalia.

The station opened simply as Latisana but in 1939 became Latisana-Lignano and in 1962 the station became known as Latisana-Lignano-Bibione.

Train services
The station is served by the following service(s):
High speed services (Frecciargento) Rome – Florence – Bologna – Padua – Venice – Trieste
High speed services (Frecciarossa) Turin – Milan – Verona – Padua – Venice – TriesteIntercity services Rome – Florence – Bologna – Padua – Venice – TriesteExpress services (Regionale Veloce) Venice – Portogruaro – Cervignano del Friuli – TriesteExpress services (Regionale veloce) Verona – Padua – Venice – Latisana 

Bus services
Buses operate to the former stations of Palazzolo dello Stella and Muzzana del Turgnano.

See also

History of rail transport in Italy
List of railway stations in Friuli-Venezia Giulia
Rail transport in Italy
Railway stations in Italy

References

 This article is based upon a translation of the Italian language version as of January 2016.''

External links

Railway stations in Friuli-Venezia Giulia